Dionysius of Chalcedon (fl. 320 BC) was a Greek philosopher and dialectician connected with the Megarian school. He was a native of Chalcedon on the coast of Bithynia. Dionysius was the person who first used the name Dialecticians to describe a splinter group within the Megarian school "because they put their arguments into the form of question and answer". One area of activity for the dialecticians was the framing of definitions, and Aristotle criticises a definition of life by Dionysius in his Topics:

Dionysius is also reported to have taught Theodorus the Atheist.

Notes

References

4th-century BC Greek people
4th-century BC philosophers
Ancient Chalcedonians
Natural philosophers
Megarian philosophers